Gobind Chandra Majhi (born 17 May 1956) is a Santali language writer. He has been nominated for the Sahitya Academy Award for 2016. Post retirement from Bank job, Majhi is working as the vice president of Odisha chapter of All India Santali Writers Association.

Personal life and education 
Gobinda Chandra was born in 1956 at Bahalada under Mayurbhanj district of Odisha. His father's name was Bhilu Soren and mother's name was Aarsu Soren. He passed his matriculation from Bahalda Govt High School. Then he completed his graduation from Buxi Jagabandhu Bidyadhar College, Bhubaneswar and LLB from Madhusudan Law College, Cuttack. He worked with Syndicate Bank and retired as a Senior Manager. Post retirement he has been busy pursuing his literary activities.

Literary life 
Majhi has been active both in Santali literature and films. "Bapla" and "Jolon" are two Santali movies he has been involved with.

Major works 
 Nalha – 2014
 Mid Tidag Sindur
 Hams Hamsali
 Sagen Sakam
 Nawa Sagen Sakam
 Sobonakha
 Jahergarh
 Karam Siram
 Sari Saarajom
 Maantar
 Sondhyani
 Sabata Aadang Sarikhe

Awards 
 Sahitya Academy Award – 2016
 Dalit Sahitya Academy Award
 BBR Ambedkar Fellowship
 SyndRatna Award by Corporate Office Syndicate Bank Bengaluru

References 

1956 births
Living people
Indian bankers
People from Odisha
People from Mayurbhanj district
Recipients of the Sahitya Akademi Award in Santali